Cams Hill School is a medium-sized mixed secondary school for ages 11–16, located in Shearwater Avenue in Fareham, England. Along with The Henry Cort Community College and Fareham Academy, it is one of the three main state schools which serve the town of Fareham, Hampshire.

The school attracted national media attention in 2002, when then-headteacher David Wilmot recruited teachers at a nearby Sainsbury's supermarket. He told The Daily Telegraph that he had struggled to recruit and retain newly qualified teachers.  The recruitment crisis was highlighted as a "major concern" in an OFSTED report later that year. The school had an OFSTED inspection in 2007 and was reported as a "good school". During an additional inspection in music during October 2008, the school was graded "good" for music provision. Later, in 2011, the school was rated "outstanding" by OFSTED  and subsequently converted to an academy. In 2019, the school was rated as "good" overall by OFSTED.

In 2018, a teacher at the school was banned from the profession after sending shirtless photos of himself to a pupil he was teaching at the time.

References

External links
 School website
 School location on Google Maps

Secondary schools in Hampshire
Fareham
Academies in Hampshire
Educational institutions established in 1958
1958 establishments in England